Calvin Nicholas Otis (1814–1883) was an American architect from Buffalo, New York.

Otis was born on June 23, 1814 in Onondaga County. He designed St. John's Episcopal Church on Madison Square in Savannah, Georgia, in 1851, for which he received $500, the former New York State Arsenal in the Ellicott District of Buffalo, New York, the back wall of which still stands within the Broadway Auditorium, the Buffalo Medical College, and the Mariners' Church of Detroit.

In February 1862, during the American Civil War, he volunteered for the Union Army. He was commissioned as a major in the 100th New York Infantry Regiment, and in October 1862 he was promoted to lieutenant colonel. He commanded the unit in the taking of Folly Island and was brevetted brigadier general for his meritorious service. He was discharged in June 1863. Otis died in Cuba, New York, where he was living at the time, on January 22, 1883.

See also
List of American Civil War brevet generals (Union)

References 

1814 births
1883 deaths
19th-century American architects
Architects from Buffalo, New York
Military personnel from Buffalo, New York
People from Onondaga County, New York
People of New York (state) in the American Civil War
Union Army officers